The 1986 Chicago Marathon was the 10th running of the annual marathon race in Chicago, United States, and was held on October 26. The elite men's race was won by Japan's Toshihiko Seko in a time of 2:08:27 hours, and the women's race was won by Norway's Ingrid Kristiansen in 2:27:08. A total of 8173 runners finished the race, an increase of over 600 from the previous year, and a number that would not be beaten until 1995.

Results

Men

Women

References

Results. Association of Road Racing Statisticians. Retrieved 2020-05-25.

External links 
 Official website

1986
Chicago
1980s in Chicago
1986 in Illinois
Chicago Marathon
Chicago Marathon